Claude Jean Joseph Cyr (March 27, 1939 – June 1, 1971) was a Canadian professional ice hockey goaltender who played in one National Hockey League game for the Montreal Canadiens during the 1958–59 NHL season. He replaced Claude Pronovost for one period against the Toronto Maple Leafs on March 19, 1959. The year of his death was confirmed by the Trail Smoke Eater Assn., since Cyr was a member of the championship team in 1961.

See also
List of players who played only one game in the NHL

References

External links

1939 births
1971 deaths
Calgary Stampeders (WHL) players
Canadian ice hockey defencemen
Cleveland Barons (1937–1973) players
Greensboro Generals (EHL) players
Montreal Canadiens players
Ice hockey people from Montreal